Vanyushin's Children is a 1973 Soviet drama film directed by Yevgeny Tashkov.

Plot 
The film tells about the life of an ordinary merchant family Vanyushins, whose members are very different from each other.

Cast 
 Boris Andreyev as Aleksandr Vanyushin (as B. Andreyev)
 Nina Zorskaya as Arina Ivanovna Vanyushina (as N. Zorskaya)
 Aleksandr Kaydanovsky as Kostya (as A. Kaydanovskiy)
 Lyudmila Gurchenko as Klavdiya Shchyotkina (as L. Gurchenko)
 Valentina Sharykina as Valentina Krasavina (as V. Sharykina)
 Aleksandr Voevodin as Aleksey Vanyushin (as A. Voevodin)
 Oleg Golubitsky as Pavel Shchyotkin (as O. Golubitskiy)
 Viktor Pavlov as Krasavin Fyodorovich (as V. Pavlov)
 Elena Solovey as Lenochka (as Ye. Solovey)

References

External links 
 

1973 films
1970s Russian-language films
Soviet drama films
1973 drama films